Opticom may refer to:
Opticom (company), a Norwegian electronics company
Opticom System, a signal preemption device